SAWA is a Palestinian, non-profit civil society organization established in 1998 by a group of female volunteers active in women's issues.

This organization works to eliminate all types of violence against women and children, and to promote gender equality in Palestinian society.  The vision of SAWA is clearly stated:  "Sawa Foundation seeks to be an initiative for a Palestinian society that combats all forms of violence and abuse against women and children, and supports human health, dignity and safety."

SAWA works toward the goals of this vision in several basic ways.  Intensively trained volunteers and staff work at the national call center hot line, which is free for callers.  Counseling and support is given and if needed, medical and legal guidance as well.  People in need of SAWA's services can also contact them through email.
In addition to the main call center, SAWA has a mobile clinic which allows them to conduct outreach programs in different parts of the community and outlying areas.  SAWA also provides training and technical assistance for law enforcement, school personnel and others in the areas of domestic violence and abuse.

A special hotline for children was established by SAWA and became available for use in 2005.  It is called the Palestinian Child Protection Helpline and is part of an international network of child help lines called Child Helpline International.

SAWA also publishes and distributes printed material for the purpose of education and awareness of physical, psychological and sexual violence.  These efforts toward outreach resulted in the major role SAWA had/has in assisting victims of the siege of Gaza in 2008/09.
During the siege of Gaza, an emergency hotline was opened up for traumatized children and parents in Gaza.  200-250 calls per day were coming into SAWA's hotline.
SAWA is also very active in combatting human trafficking and the prostitution of Palestinian girls and women.
SAWA wrote an extensive report regarding this problem, called, "Trafficking and Forced Prostitution of Palestinian Women and Girls: Forms of Modern Day Slavery."

Sawa's helpline 
Sawa has several programs combatting Gender Based Violence (GBV). The core program is the helpline which operates in all of the Palestinian Territories. Callers can reach the helpline in various different ways.

Phone Counseling
121 (West Bank and Gaza) or 1-800-500-121 (East Jerusalem) is a toll-free dial number that connects the caller with trained volunteers based in either Ramallah or Jerusalem. It provides support and assistance, primary social and psychological counseling for women, children, and men who have been exposed to various forms of violence and abuse. The call center is open 24 hours a day every day.

Chat Counseling
Sawa has a Whatsapp dedicated to chat counseling. The page provides a chat counselling program so that it is possible to communicate without talking on the phone, which is often used by residents outside of the Occupied Palestinian Territories. The chat is open 24 hours a day every day.

Face-to-Face
Sawa provides social and psychological counseling for people in all age groups to cope with different areas of life such as family, school, work, etc.. The center is operated by a team specialized in social and psychological counselling and provides confidential private sessions. The sessions are provided upon request from the caller through any of the media listed above.

History
In August 1998 a group of eight trained volunteers from the Jerusalem Rape Crisis Centre (JRCC) started operating a special helpline for Arab women. The helpline aimed to "provide a comprehensive response to the suffering of loval women subject to the trauma of sexual violence". Soon after the start up of the helpline it was decided - in agreement with JRCC - to establish an independently administered organisation in Palestine.

For many years the helpline was based in the offices of JRCC, but in 2002 the first funding opportunity from the European Commission came and in April 2003 the organization rented their own office. Sawa conducted one yearly training course every year targeting 15 female participants. The training lasted three months (56 hours), and after completion, the volunteers became members of Sawa's volunteers' forum.

In 2004 the need for a Child Protection Helpline was recognized and implemented. The Child Protection Helpline became a member of the Child Helpline International in 2005, and international network of child helplines from 143 countries.

In 2008 during the war on Gaza, Sawa Organization expanded its helpline to cover 24 hours, 7 days a week. Sawa also expanded its helpline to cover 24/7 during the Israeli aggressions in 2010.

From 2009 to 2011 Sawa went through large technological progress. They added an IP-phone system, which allowed the organization to receive and document more calls. It also allowed the development of an electronic database, the Caller Information Database. The Caller Information Database featured a statistical report function that could be used finding and targeting new problems in society. Sawa won the Arab Gulf Fund for UN Development in 2010 for its technological progress.

In 2010 the training program was extended from 80 hours to 110 hours. The additional 30 hours of training consisted of practical training, listening to other counsellors, discussing the various approaches to calls.

In 2014 Sawa's facilities were renovated and Sawa installed a solar power system and a generator, allowing the organization to run the helpline in situations of power cuts.

Programs
The main focus of Sawa Organization is to combat violence against women and children, as stated on their homepage. Besides, the organization runs various programs to combat other issues in the Palestinian society.

Helpline
The Helpline is the core of Sawa's work. It operates from 24 hours a day every day of the week. The counsellors are volunteers and go through training. The helpline is toll-free and supported by PalTel. The Helpline offers counselling by phone, chat, e-mail and face-to-face.

Educational programs
Sawa arranges various workshops which lasts from 1–3 months.  The workshops focus on violence and harassment and uses dialogue as the primary approach. Some workshops include sport sessions in order to raise physical awareness. 
Sawa targets children through specific workshops. These workshops consist of puppets shows and discussion. The puppet shows are used as an indirect way of targeting problems such as sexual abuse to children.

Sawa also trains professionals such as police officers, prosecutors, medical staff and the family protection unit of the Palestinian Police. They're trained on how to deal with victims of violence, how to deal with the perpetrator and intervention plans.

Publications
 Sawa Organization (2014), AIDS 2014
 Khsheiboun, D. Sana' (2013), Helpline provides: Support and counseling for women and girls
 Sawa Organization (2013), Trafficking and Forced Prostitution of Palestinian Women and Girls: Forms of Modern Day Slavery, 2nd Edition
 Otero, Eva (2012), SAWA Organization - Documenting Best Practices and Lessons
 Abdelmajeed, Ayman (2011),  Palestinian Child Helpline 121 - Reality and Challenges

References

External links
Sawa Organization – Sawa Organization

Organizations established in 1998
Palestinian charities
Women's rights in the Middle East
Women's rights in the State of Palestine